Martí is a Catalan name and may refer to:

People

Surname
Cristóbal Martí (born 1903), Spanish footballer
David Martí (born 1971), Spanish Oscar winner for best makeup
Enriqueta Martí (1868–1913), Spanish "witch"
Farabundo Martí (1893–1932), Salvadoran revolutionary
Fernando Martí (c. 1994–2008), Mexican kidnap and murder victim
Inka Martí (born 1964), Spanish journalist, editor, writer, and photographer
Javier Martí (born 1992), Spanish tennis player
Jesús Martí Martín (1899–1975), Spanish architect who migrated to Mexico
José Luis Martí (born 1975), Spanish footballer
Joan Martí i Alanis (1928–2009), co-prince of Andorra
José Martí (1853–1895), Cuban national hero and poet
Josep Maria Martí (born 2005), Spanish racing driver
Juan José Martí (1570–1604), Spanish Golden Age novelist
Marcel Martí (1925–2010), Argentine-born sculptor
Nerea Martí (born 2002), Spanish racing driver
Paula Martí (born 1980), Spanish golfer

Given name
Martí Joan de Galba, 15th-century Spanish author

Other uses
 Farabundo Martí National Liberation Front, a political party in El Salvador
 Martí, Cuba, a town in the province of Matanzas
 José Martí International Airport, Havana, Cuba
 Radio y Televisión Martí, U.S. government propaganda outlets broadcasting to Cuba
 Martí (crater), a crater on Mercury

See also
Marty (disambiguation)
Marti (disambiguation)

Catalan-language surnames